The Hotel Continental, built in 1870, is one of the oldest hotels in Tangier, Morocco. The yellowing pages of the 19th-century guestbook refer to notable residents, Edgar Degas, Winston Churchill, and the Beat poets among them, and Bernardo Bertolucci's The Sheltering Sky was partly filmed here. It is located in the Medina area of the city and some of the rooms overlook the harbor.

References

External links

Official website 

Buildings and structures in Tangier
Hotels in Morocco
Hotel buildings completed in 1870
19th-century architecture in Morocco